Sir Charles Henry Wilson (13 January 1859 – 30 December 1930) was a British Conservative Party politician. He was the Member of Parliament (MP) for Leeds Central, 26 July 1923 – 30 May 1929.

Wilson was a councillor and alderman on Leeds City Council from 1890 to 1928, and council leader for a period, and also an accountant, Justice of the Peace and Freeman of the City.

References

External links
 

1859 births
1930 deaths
Conservative Party (UK) MPs for English constituencies
Councillors in Leeds
Politicians from Leeds
UK MPs 1922–1923
UK MPs 1923–1924
UK MPs 1924–1929